MAPT antisense RNA 1 is a noncoding RNA that in humans is encoded by the MAPT-AS1 gene.

References

Further reading